Events from the year 1860 in Denmark.

Incumbents
 Monarch – Frederick VII
 Prime minister – Carl Edvard Rotwitt (until 8 February), Carl Christian Hall (from 24 February)

Events

 20 November - The frigate Jylland is launched at Holmen in Copenhagen.

Undated

Births
 15 December – Niels Ryberg Finsen, Nobel Prize-winning physician (died 1904)

Deaths
 30 January – Jørgen Hansen Koch, architect (born 1787)
 1 May – Anders Sandøe Ørsted, jurist and politician, Prime Minister of Denmark (born 1778)

References

 
1860s in Denmark
Denmark
Years of the 19th century in Denmark